Grevillea metamorpha is a species of flowering plant in the family Proteaceae and is endemic to an area in the Mid West region of Western Australia. It is an erect, spindly shrub with three types of divided leaves, and clusters of white, silky-hairy flowers.

Description

TaxonomyGrevillea metamorpha was first formally described in 2000 by Robert Makinson in the Flora of Australia from specimens collected by Michael Clyde Hislop near the Green Head-Coorow road in 1995. The specific epithet (metamorpha) means "changing form", referring to the transition in leaf form on the floral branches.

Distribution and habitat
This grevillea is only known from the type location in the Geraldton Sandplains bioregion of south-western Western Australia, where it grows along a creekline.

Conservation statusGrevillea metamorpha'' is listed as "Priority One" by the Government of Western Australia Department of Biodiversity, Conservation and Attractions, meaning that it is known from only one or a few locations which are potentially at risk.

See also
 List of Grevillea species

References

metamorpha
Proteales of Australia
Eudicots of Western Australia
Taxa named by Robert Owen Makinson
Plants described in 2000